The 2016 Vancouver Whitecaps FC season is the Whitecaps' sixth season in Major League Soccer, the top tier of soccer in the United States and Canada.

Season overview

December

Roster

Transfers

In

Out

Technical staff

Management

Major League Soccer

Preseason

Simple Invitational

Regular season

League tables

Western Conference

Overall

Results

CONCACAF Champions League

Group stage

Knockout stage

Quarter-finals

Semi-finals

Canadian Championship

Friendlies

Cascadia Cup

Playing statistics

Appearances (Apps.) numbers are for appearances in competitive games only including sub appearances
Red card numbers denote:   Numbers in parentheses represent red cards overturned for wrongful dismissal.

 *No longer with team

See also 
 2016 Whitecaps FC 2 season

References 

2016
2016 Major League Soccer season
2016 in Canadian sports
2016 in British Columbia
Canadian soccer clubs 2016 season